Pigeon Creek is a tributary of the Ohio River in southwestern Indiana. The forks merge southeast of Fort Branch, and from there it heads southeast under its new northern crossing of Interstate 69 towards Warrick County near Lynnville. From there it heads south, under Interstate 64, where it is signed as the "Wabash and Erie Canal" instead of as Pigeon Creek. The creek becomes larger as the Little and Big Bluegrass Creeks empty into it in western Warrick County. The larger creek then turns west crossing into Vanderburgh County under its older former Interstate 164 crossing, now also part of Interstate 69, just north of Evansville's East Side. The creek has a few more tributaries join as it first heads west through Evansville's East and North Sides then south between Downtown Evansville and Westside Evansville, where it empties into the Ohio River.

The remaining 21% is covered by forests (50,000 acres of woodlands).

In the past the banks of Pigeon Creek have been home to several businesses and manufacturers, including a textile mill, which was abandoned in the early 20th century. In the 1800s it was part of the Wabash & Erie Canal that provided flatboats access to the Ohio River near the mouth. Farm practices in the past channelized many of the tiny streams that feed the creek (the headwaters), and construction of the Wabash & Erie Canal in the 1800s significantly altered the natural channel of the creek as it flows south past Millersburg toward Stephenson Station. However, the canal ceased to follow the Pigeon Creek where its current path drastically changes from a southern path to a western one in Warrick County. This left the majority of the remaining stretch undeveloped, and in comparison to other streams in urban cities.

The creek, as a wildlife oasis in the middle of a bustling city, provides habitats for various fish, waterfowl, and mammals. The Pigeon Creek Greenway Passage is a walking/jogging/biking trail along the Pigeon Creek and the Ohio Riverfront.

See also
 List of rivers of Indiana

References

Rivers of Indiana
Tributaries of the Ohio River
Rivers of Vanderburgh County, Indiana
Rivers of Gibson County, Indiana
Rivers of Warrick County, Indiana